Ortiz House in Yuma, Arizona was built in 1901.  It was listed on the National Register of Historic Places in 1982.

Along with the Polhamus House and the G.W. Norton House, the Ortiz House demonstrates an evolution of house plans in Yuma, by showing "a zaguan configuration with two rows of rooms opening off of a central hall."

See also
 List of historic properties in Yuma, Arizona 
 National Register of Historic Places listings in Yuma County, Arizona

References

Houses in Yuma County, Arizona
Houses completed in 1901
Houses on the National Register of Historic Places in Arizona
National Register of Historic Places in Yuma County, Arizona
Buildings and structures in Yuma, Arizona